Pamela (French: Paméla) is a 1945 French historical drama film directed by Pierre de Hérain and starring Fernand Gravey, Renée Saint-Cyr and Georges Marchal.

It is based on an 1898 play of the same title by Victorien Sardou which portrays an attempt to rescue the young Louis XVII from prison during the French Revolution. The film's sets were designed by the art director Roland Quignon.

It recorded admissions in France of 1,649,882.

Cast
 Fernand Gravey as Paul Barras  
 Renée Saint-Cyr as Paméla  
 Georges Marchal as René Bergerin  
 Yvette Lebon as Madame Tallien  
 Jeanne Fusier-Gir as La Montansier  
 Raymond Bussières as Gomin 
 Jacques Varennes as Rochecotte  
 Gisèle Casadesus as Joséphine de Beauharnais  
 Jacques Castelot as Le prince de Carency  
 René Génin as Gourlet 
 Serge Emrich as Louis XVII  
 Nicole Maurey as Madame Royale 
 Jean Boissemond 
 André Carnège 
 Jean Chaduc as Napoléon Bonaparte  
 Henri Charrett as Baudu  
 Marius David 
 Paul Demange as Un membre du comité  
 Huguette Ferly 
 Richard Francoeur as Le commissaire  
 Jacques Grétillat as Le Villeheurnois  
 Marie-Reine Kergal 
 Maurice Lagrenée as Lapierre  
 Georges Marny as Bottot  
 Roland Milès 
 Jean Ozenne as Bourguignon  
 Jean Rigaux as Barnerin  
 Max Roche 
 Hélène Tossy 
 Vandéric 
 Jeanne Véniat

References

Bibliography
 Goble, Alan. The Complete Index to Literary Sources in Film. Walter de Gruyter, 1999.

External links
Pamela at IMDb

1945 films
French films based on plays
Films based on works by Victorien Sardou
1940s French-language films
1940s historical drama films
French historical drama films
Films set in Paris
Films set in the 1790s
French Revolution films
Films directed by Pierre de Hérain
Depictions of Napoleon on film
Cultural depictions of Joséphine de Beauharnais
French black-and-white films
1945 drama films
Cultural depictions of Louis XVII
1940s French films